Ederlezi may refer to:
the Romani name of the Hıdırellez spring festival
Ederlezi (song)
A pastoral (theatre of Soule) played in 2013 in Gotein-Libarrenx, France.
 The latest collection of fine jewelry pieces launched by Nadia Petrova Joyeria y Decoracion.

See also
Đurđevdan (Saint George's Day in Spring)